Voronezh Malshevo is an air base in Voronezh Oblast of the Russian Air Force as part of the 6th Air and Air Defence Forces Army, Western Military District.  and Baltimore. The base is home to the 47th Composite Guards Aviation Regiment which operates two squadrons of Sukhoi Su-34s (ASCC: Fullback).

History

Up until late 2009 it was the home of the 105th Composite Aviation Division and 455th Bomber Aviation Regiment, both with 16th Air Army/Special Purpose Command, the air forces command of the Moscow Military District. Following the air force reforms of 2009–10, it became the headquarters of the 7000th Air Base.

Warfare.ru says:
"unit # 23326. 7000th Guard Borisov-Pomeransk Double Red Banner Order Suvorov Airbase. Address: 394055, Voronezh. ex 105 comb div + 455 bbr, 183, 47 recce, 89 attack rgts. Planned staff 2009: 24 Su-24M, 4 An-30, 1 Mi-8, ? 2 Su-34. 2010: 2 sqdn Su-24M, 1 sqdn Su-24MR, Mig-25RB + An-30. 20.10.2011 Su-24 crashed during landing in Amur distr, pilots dead."

The Natural Resources Defense Council listed it as a nuclear bomber base in a nuclear war study. However, no other sources on Long-Range Aviation list it as a bomber base.

On 9 November 2020 a soldier, Pvt. Anton Makarov, went on a rampage at the air base after seizing an officers pistol and killing him and two others.  The soldier was the subject of a manhunt launched across the region.

References

External links 
http://www.ww2.dk/new/air%20force/regiment/bap/455bap.htm

Soviet Air Force bases
Russian Air Force bases